Goverlan Reach Systems Management is  a remote support software created and distributed by Goverlan, Inc.
Goverlan is an on-premises client management software designed for medium to large enterprises for remote control, active directory management, global configuration change management, and reporting within a Windows IT Infrastructure.

History
Goverlan Reach, the primary product of Goverlan, Inc. was conceived and created in 1996 as a result of working at an investment bank in New York City with help-desks worldwide. The product was later commercialized and Goverlan Inc was incorporated in 1998.

Features
The Goverlan Reach Remote Support Software is used for remote support, IT process automation, IT management, software installation, inventory, and remote control. Other features include: displaying system information, mapping printers, and Wake-on-LAN settings.

Remote Control
Goverlan Reach Remote Control (RC) is a remote desktop support software option for IT specialists. Goverlan allows for remote control and desktop sharing. With Goverlan, administrators can remote shadow multiple client sessions in a single pane and multiple administrators can participate in a single remote control session. In addition, an administrator can capture screenshots or video recordings during a remote session.
There are Other features that Goverlan Remote Control supports such as: remote assistance with the ability to connect to computers over the internet, transfer files, or view multiple sessions in one screen and control bandwidth used during a remote session. Goverlan supports Citrix XenApp and Microsoft Terminal Services shadowing.

Behind-the-scenes systems management
The Goverlan Administration & Diagnostics tool integrates into an existing Active Directory (AD) organization unit (OU) structure for Windows Systems management. Goverlan can perform remote administration on a single machine, group of machines, or entire domain. Goverlan is compatible with VDI, RDP, and Citrix deployments.

Global IT Process Automation module
The Goverlan IT Process Automation module allows IT administrators to manage various objects such as : software updates,  reports generation, adding or removing registry keys, or any other actions that can be applied to a single computer or a network. Scope Actions allow IT administrators to execute configuration management tasks on client machines, query machines, collect information about user logged-in machines, hardware, software, or processes, and remote monitor workstations in real time,  as opposed to retrieving information from a database. IT administrators may also use Goverlan for patch management to push patches to servers or workstations.

WMIX
WMIX is Goverlan free WMI Explorer which generates WMI queries using the WQL wizard and exports custom queries to other Windows. The WMIX tool makes use of pre-existing Windows Management Instrumentation scripts within an interface. A technician can generate a VBScript by defining parameters and clicking the generate script button.

Technologies
	LDAP – The Lightweight Directory Access Protocol is used by Goverlan for Active Directory integration.
	WMI – The Windows Management Instrumentation technology is used by Goverlan to expose agent-free systems management services to Windows systems.
	Intel vPro AMT – The Intel Active Management Technology allows the out-of-band management of Intel vPro ready systems regardless of the system's power state.

Security
Goverlan Systems Management Software provides the following security features:
	AES 256 bit Encryption (Windows Vista and later) or RSA 128 bit Encryption (Windows XP and earlier).
 Microsoft Security Support Provider Interface technology (SSPI) securely authenticates the identity of the person initiating a connection. SSPI is also used to impersonate the identity of this person on the client machine.  Using the identity and privileges of the person who initiated the remote control session, the remote control session is either authorized or rejected.
 Central or machine level auditing of executed remote control sessions.
 Agents communicate through a single, encrypted TCP port.

Limitations
Goverlan's desktop software can only be installed on Windows based computers (Windows XP and Above). Goverlan client agents can only be installed on Windows based computers (Windows 2000 and above) Goverlan requires the installation of client agents. However, client agents can be installed via a network rather than independently.

See also
 Remote support
	List of systems management systems
	Comparison of remote desktop software
 Remote desktop software
 Desktop sharing

References

External links
     Goverlan, Inc. Official Site

Remote desktop
Mobile device management software
Help desk software
System administration
Computer access control
Remote administration software
Windows remote administration software
Systems management